is a 2014 Japanese drama film directed by Yoji Yamada and based on a novel by Kyoko Nakajima. It was released in Japan on 25 January 2014.

Plot

The film is set in the 1930s and 1940s in Japan.  It is narrated from the memoirs of Taki Nunomiya as an old woman. In 1930, she left Yamagata for Tokyo as an indentured servant to work as a housemaid.

Cast
Takako Matsu
Haru Kuroki
Hidetaka Yoshioka
Satoshi Tsumabuki
Chieko Baisho
Takataro Kataoka
Kazuko Yoshiyuki
Yui Natsukawa
Nenji Kobayashi
Fumino Kimura
Yukijirō Hotaru
Takashi Sasano
Hidetaka Yoshioka - Itakura
Shigeru Muroi
Tomoko Nakajima
Isao Hashizume

Reception
The film was in competition for the Golden Bear at the 64th Berlin International Film Festival, where Haru Kuroki won the Silver Bear for Best Actress.

Two days after being released it had grossed ¥123 million (US$1.19 million) at the Japanese box office.

References

External links
  
 

2014 drama films
2014 films
Films scored by Joe Hisaishi
Films based on Japanese novels
Films directed by Yoji Yamada
Films set in Japan
Films set in the 1930s
Japanese drama films
Films with screenplays by Yôji Yamada
2010s Japanese films